Deborah A. Duchon (June 24, 1949 – October 14, 2019) was an American anthropologist and Food Network personality. She was also the Director of Nutrition Education for New Americans Project and Director of the Center for Research and Anthropology at Georgia State University.

Early life
Deborah Duchon was born on June 24, 1949, in Covington, Kentucky, and grew up in Cleveland, Ohio. She later attended Ohio University, graduating in 1971. She later received her MA in anthropology from Georgia State University.

Career
Duchon co-founded the company Attorneys' Personal Services with her husband Paul Tamaroff soon after their marriage in 1988. Her later work in Anthropology was described in The Atlanta Journal-Constitution as, "work in instructing emergency workers including police and first responders in cross cultural communication, and food related nutritional guidance". Her academic work as a researcher and teacher at Georgia State also focused on the Hmong people of Southeast Asia within their expat community in the United States. At the university she also served as the Director of Nutrition Education for New Americans Project, a joint group hosted by both the Geography and Anthropology departments, as well as the Director of the Center for Research and Anthropology. She was also the founder of Culinary Historians of Atlanta.

She is perhaps best known for her recurring role on the Food Network series Good Eats. She also appeared on NPR's radio show Morning Edition.

Death
Duchon died as the result of brain cancer on October 14, 2019.

References

2019 deaths
1949 births
American anthropologists
American anthropology writers
Academics from Kentucky
Academics from Ohio
People from Covington, Kentucky
Ohio State University alumni
Georgia State University alumni
Georgia State University faculty
Academics from Georgia (U.S. state)